Janakpur Road is a town and a notified area in Sitamarhi district in the Indian state of Bihar.

Demographics
 India census, Janakpur Road had a population of 15,129. Males constitute 53% of the population and females 47%. Janakpur Road has an average literacy rate of 89.14%, higher than the national average of 74.04%: male literacy is 80%, and female literacy is 65.46%. In Janakpur Road, 17% of the population is under 0 — 6 years of age.

 The town is noted for the famous Baba Nageshwarnath Temple, dedicated to Lord Shiva & Madarsa Aziziya Jama Masjid Pupri which is founded by the Secretary of that time Maulana Manzarul Hasan.

Transport
Pupri, an agro-based industrial town, is located in Sitamarhi District in Bihar. It is around 30 km south-east of Sitamarhi.

Janaki Temple, dedicated to Goddess Sita, is a nearby attraction. The town is directly connected with Nanpura (8 km south), Bajpatti (17 km north-west) and Jaynagar (34 km north-east) by road. Madhubani (south-east), Benipatti (north-west) and Sitamarhi (north-west) are ideal tourist destinations. 
Nearest airport is Darbhanga Airport. Janakpur Road Railway Station, of Eastern Railways, serves this town.

References

Cities and towns in Sitamarhi district